The Correspondence with Enemies Act 1691 (3 & 4 Will. & Mar. c. 13) was an Act of the Parliament of England which made it high treason to correspond with the deposed King James II. It was replaced by the Correspondence with the Pretender Act 1697 (9 Will. 3 c. 1).

After James's death, the Correspondence with James the Pretender (High Treason) Act 1701 (13 & 14 Will. 3 c. 3) and the Correspondence with Enemies Act 1704 (3 & 4 Ann. c. 13) made it treason to correspond with his son, and the Treason Act 1743 (17 Geo. 2 c. 39) made it treason to correspond with his son's sons.

See also
Jacobitism
High treason in the United Kingdom
Mutiny Act 1703

1691 in law
1691 in England
Treason in England
Acts of the Parliament of England
James II of England